
The year 500 BC was a year of the pre-Julian Roman calendar. In the Roman Republic it was known as the Year of the Consulship of Camerinus and Longus (or, less frequently, year 254  Ab urbe condita). The denomination 500 BC for this year has been used since the early medieval period, when the Anno Domini calendar era became the prevalent method in Europe for naming years.

Events

By place

Europe 
 Vulca makes Apollo of Veii, from Portonaccio Temple, now kept at Museo Nazionale di Villa Giulia, Rome.
 The Nordic Bronze Age civilization ends and the Pre-Roman Iron Age begins in Scandinavia, according to the Oscar Montelius periodization system (approximate date).
 Refugees from Teos resettle Abdera.

Middle East 
 Darius I of Persia proclaims that Aramaic will be the official language of the western half of his empire.

Africa 
 Bantu-speaking people migrate into south-west Uganda from Central Africa. (approximate date)
 The Hutu tribe emerges around this time, in Middle and Southern Africa. (approximate date)
 Hanno the Navigator's naval exploration of the western coast of Africa could have reached as far south as Gabon.

Asia 
 The first republic in Vaishali, Bihar, India is founded.
 States in existence include the Kingdom of Pratipalapura (centred on modern Bhattiprolu, in Guntur district, Andhra Pradesh).
 Yayoi period starts in Ancient Japan (approximate date).

Mesoamerica 
 The oldest known Zapotec writing appears (approximate date).
 The Olmecs establish Monte Albán, the sacred city, and continue building pyramids. Founded toward the end of the Middle Formative period at around 500 BC, by the Terminal Formative (ca.100 BC-AD 200) Monte Albán soon becomes the capital of a large-scale expansionist polity that dominates much of the Oaxacan highlands and interacts with other Mesoamerican regional states, such as Teotihuacan to the north (Paddock 1983; Marcus 1983).

By topic

Demographics 
 The world population reaches 100,000,000—85,000,000 in the Eastern Hemisphere and 15,000,000 in the Western Hemisphere, primarily Mesoamerica and northern South America (Mexico, Central America, Colombia, Peru, Venezuela).

Arts and culture 
 The She-wolf, with late 15th century or early 16th century additions (twins), is made. It is now kept at the Museo Capitolino in Rome (approximate date).

Inventions, discoveries, introductions
 Mesoamerican calendars are developed by the Olmec civilisation

Births 
 Anaxagoras, Pre-Socratic Greek philosopher (approximate date) (d. 428 BC)

References